Acrochalix callosa is a species of medium-sized sea snail, a marine gastropod mollusk in the family Eulimidae. This is the only known species within the genus Acrochalix.

Distribution

This marine species is mainly distributed within the north Atlantic Ocean.

References

External links
 To World Register of Marine Species

Eulimidae
Gastropods described in 1986